Aulonocara aquilonium is a species of fish in the family Cichlidae. It is endemic to Malawi. Its natural habitat is freshwater lakes where it occurs in areas of sandy substrate where mature males defend a small territory of sand against other mature males of this species. The foraging females and non-breeding males form large schools. During the months of November and December A. aquilonium is abundant where there is an interface between rock and sandy habitats near Mdoka on the northwestern shores of Lake Malawi

References

Fish of Malawi
aquilonium
Taxa named by Ad Konings
Fish described in 1995
Taxonomy articles created by Polbot
Fish of Lake Malawi